Emily Short is an interactive fiction (IF) writer.

She is perhaps best known for her debut game Galatea and her use of psychologically complex non-player characters (NPCs).

Short has been called "a visionary in the world of text-based games for years," and is the author of over forty works of IF in addition to being chief editor of the IF Theory Book.
She wrote a regular column on interactive fiction (IF) for Rock, Paper, Shotgun.

Career 
In June 2011, Emily Short, with Richard Evans, co-founded Little TextPeople, which explored the emotional possibilities of interactive fiction. It was acquired in early 2012 by Linden Lab. In 2014, Short was let go by Linden Lab, ending the project she was working on, Versu. 

In September 2016, Short was hired by Spirit AI, a roughly 15 person company working on machine learning and natural language processing. She joined its board of directors in 2018, and was later named Chief Product Officer. 

In January 2020, Short joined the 12 person Failbetter Games as creative director.

Interactive fiction

Works 
A number of Short's works have won acclaim at the XYZZY Awards, an annual popular-choice award for interactive fiction. Her work has been described by reviewers in terms that range from "mesmerizing" to "frustrating".  Her 2003 work City of Secrets was originally commissioned by a San Francisco synth-pop band, but after they left the project, she completed it on her own.

Of over 11,000 games in the Interactive Fiction Database in July 2021, Short's game Counterfeit Monkey held the top spot in the IFDB Top 100. In addition to this, another five of Short's games, Savoir-Faire, City of Secrets, Bronze, Metamorphoses and Bee qualified into the top 100.

Tools 
While many of Short's early games were written in Inform, she later experimented with a variety of formats. One such format was Versu, an engine for plot-heavy and story-rich interactive fiction that Short helped develop, and which was later scrapped by Linden Lab, the company owning the engine. Other formats include Varytale, for which she developed the game Bee, and a custom engine by Liza Daly (with help from the company inkle) for the game First Draft of the Revolution. Both formats use an interactive fiction engine based on hyperlinks.

Inform 7 
Short wrote most of the 300+ programming examples in the documentation and created two full-length demo games for release with Graham Nelson's interactive fiction development system, Inform 7.

Selected IF works

See also
Electronic literature
Cybertext

References

External links
Emily Short's interactive fiction blog
Collection of Emily Short's work
Short's entry in the Interactive Fiction Wiki

Living people
American emigrants to England
American media critics
American video game programmers
Interactive fiction writers
Women video game critics
Women video game developers
Women video game programmers
Year of birth missing (living people)